Khalik Mammadov  (June 28, 1958, Astara, Azerbaijan SSR) – Vice President of the State Oil Company of Azerbaijan Republic on HR, IT and regulations.

Biography 
Khalik Mammadov was born June 28, 1958 in Astara district of Azerbaijan SSR. In 1984 he graduated from Engineer-electrician Department of Institute of Oil and Chemistry named after M. Azizbayov. Author of 8 scientific articles. Thanks to his scientific work on the role of motivation in staff management, he is a PhD in economics.

Started career in 1976 at the Baku New Oil Refinery. Was the Chairman of refinery's labor union committee in 1985–1991, Deputy Chairman of Executive Committee of Nizami district of Baku in 1991–1992, first deputy head of Executive Power of Nizami district, engineering director of "Azinteroil" joint venture under the New Oil Refinery. In 1992–1994, held position of chief specialist at the organization department of Azerbaijan Labor Union Confederation, in 1994–2005, head of human resources department, Deputy General Director, Deputy Director for HR and regulations at the "Azerneftyanajag" Production Enterprise and was the Chief of SOCAR Administrative Department in 2005–2007. Since 2007, he is SOCAR Vice President for HR, IT and regulations. In 2008, he was awarded the title of "Honored Engineer". He is the member of New Azerbaijan Party. Married and has 1 son and 1 daughter.

In 1986–1991 he was a member of the Presidium of the Labor Union Committee of Azerbaijan, and in 1990–1992 was elected as a member of the General Confederation of Labor Unions of the USSR (GCLU) and the chairman of the Subcommittee on Occupational Safety and Environment Protection of the GCLU.

Chairman of the board of directors of the Azerbaijan International Education Center (AIEC), Baku French Lyceum (BFL) and SOCAR Media, Editor-in-Chief of "SOCAR plus" magazine.

Awards 

 USSR Labor Union's award (1990)
 "Honored engineer" of Azerbaijan Republic (2008)
 2nd rank of "Labor Order" of Azerbaijan Republic (2017)

References 

New Azerbaijan Party politicians
1958 births
Living people